The History of Shetland concerns the subarctic archipelago of Shetland in Scotland. The early history of the islands is dominated by the influence of the Vikings. From the 14th century, it was incorporated into the Kingdom of Scotland, and later into the United Kingdom.

Prehistory

Due to building in stone on virtually treeless islands—a practice dating to at least the early Neolithic Period—Shetland is extremely rich in physical remains of the prehistoric era, and there are over 5,000 archaeological sites. A midden site at West Voe on the south coast of Mainland, dated to 4320–4030 BC, has provided the first evidence of Mesolithic human activity in Shetland. 

The same site provides dates for early Neolithic activity, and finds at Scourd of Brouster in Walls have been dated to 3400 BC. "Shetland knives" are stone tools that date from this period made from felsite from Northmavine.

Brochs were built in Shetland until 150-200 AD: in the case of Old Scatness in Shetland (near Jarlshof), brochs were sometimes located close to arable land and a source of water (some have wells or natural springs rising within their central space). Sometimes, on the other hand, they were sited in wilderness areas (e.g. Levenwick and Culswick in main Shetland). Brochs are often built beside the sea and sometimes they are on islands in lochs (e.g. Clickimin in Shetland).

The Romans were aware of (and probably circumnavigated, seeing in the distance Thule according to Tacitus) the Orkney & Shetland Islands, which they called "Orcades", where they discovered the brochs. A "king of the Orcades" was one of the 11 rulers said to have paid tribute to Claudius following his invasion of Britain in AD 43. Indeed 4th and 5th century sources include these islands in a Roman province.

Archaeological evidence suggests that the Romans only traded with the inhabitants, perhaps through intermediaries, no signs of clear occupation have been found. But, according to scholars like Montesanti, "Orkney and Shetland might have been one of those areas that suggest direct administration by Imperial Roman procurators, at least for a very short span of time".

Evidence for the language spoken in Shetland immediately before Norse colonization (c. 800 AD) is limited. Katherine Forsyth (2020) suggests that such evidence, including the island name Yell and a number of names and words found on inscriptions such those at Lunnasting and St Ninian's Isle, indicates the presence of a Celtic language of the Brittonic branch.

Viking expansion

By the end of the 9th century the Scandinavians shifted their attention from plundering to invasion, mainly due to the overpopulation of Scandinavia in comparison to resources and arable land available there.

Shetland was colonised by Norsemen in the 9th century, the fate of the existing indigenous population being uncertain. The colonists gave it that name and established their laws and language. That language evolved into the West Nordic language Norn, which survived into the 19th century.

After Harald Finehair took control of all Norway, many of his opponents fled, some to Orkney and Shetland. From the Northern Isles they continued to raid Scotland and Norway, prompting Harald Hårfagre to raise a large fleet which he sailed to the islands. In about 875 he and his forces took control of Shetland and Orkney. Ragnvald, Earl of Møre received Orkney and Shetland as an earldom from the king as reparation for his son's being killed in battle in Scotland. Ragnvald gave the earldom to his brother Sigurd the Mighty.

Shetland was Christianised in the 10th century.

Conflict with Norway 
In 1194 when king Sverre Sigurdsson (ca 1145–1202) ruled Norway and Harald Maddadsson was Earl of Orkney and Shetland, the Lendmann Hallkjell Jonsson and the Earl's brother-in-law Olav raised an army called the eyjarskeggjar on Orkney and sailed for Norway. Their pretender king was Olav's young foster son Sigurd, son of king Magnus Erlingsson. The eyjarskeggjar were beaten in the Battle of Florvåg near Bergen. The body of Sigurd Magnusson was displayed for the king in Bergen in order for him to be sure of the death of his enemy, but he also demanded that Harald Maddadsson (Harald jarl) answer for his part in the uprising. In 1195 the earl sailed to Norway to reconcile with King Sverre. As a punishment the king placed the earldom of Shetland under the direct rule of the king, from which it was probably never returned.

Growing Scottish interest

When Alexander III of Scotland turned twenty-one in 1262 and became of age, he declared his intention of continuing the aggressive policy his father had begun towards the western and northern isles. This had been put on hold when his father had died thirteen years earlier. Alexander sent a formal demand to the Norwegian King Håkon Håkonsson.

After decades of civil war, Norway had achieved stability and grown to be a substantial nation with influence in Europe and the potential to be a powerful force in war. With this as a background, King Håkon rejected all demands from the Scots. The Norwegians regarded all the islands in the North Sea as part of the Norwegian realm. To add weight to his answer, King Håkon activated the leidang and set off from Norway in a fleet which is said to have been the largest ever assembled in Norway. The fleet met up in Breideyarsund in Shetland (probably today's Bressay Sound) before the king and his men sailed for Scotland and made landfall on Arran. The aim was to conduct negotiations with the army as a backup.

Alexander III drew out the negotiations while he patiently waited for the autumn storms to set in. Finally, after tiresome diplomatic talks, King Håkon lost his patience and decided to attack. At the same time a large storm set in which destroyed several of his ships and kept others from making landfall. The Battle of Largs in October 1263 was not decisive and both parties claimed victory, but King Håkon Håkonsson's position was hopeless. On 5 October, he returned to Orkney with a discontented army, and there he died of a fever on 17 December 1263. His death halted any further Norwegian expansion in Scotland.

King Magnus Lagabøte broke with his father's expansion policy and started negotiations with Alexander III. In the Treaty of Perth of 1266 he surrendered his furthest Norwegian possessions including Man and the Sudreyar (Hebrides) to Scotland in return for 4,000 marks sterling and an annuity of 100 marks. The Scots also recognised Norwegian sovereignty over Orkney and Shetland.

One of the main reasons behind the Norwegian desire for peace with Scotland was that trade with England was suffering from the constant state of war. In the new trade agreement between England and Norway in 1223 the English demanded Norway make peace with Scotland. In 1269, this agreement was expanded to include mutual free trade.

Pawned to Scotland

In the 14th century Norway still treated Orkney and Shetland as a Norwegian province, but Scottish influence was growing, and in 1379 the Scottish earl Henry Sinclair took control of Orkney on behalf of the Norwegian king Håkon VI Magnusson. In 1384 Norway was severely weakened by the Black Plague and in 1397 it entered the Kalmar Union. With time Norway came increasingly under Danish control. King Christian I of Denmark and Norway was in financial trouble and, when his daughter Margaret became engaged to James III of Scotland in 1468, he needed money to pay her dowry. Under Norse udal law, the king had no overall ownership of the land in the realm as in the Scottish feudal system. He was king of his people, rather than king of the land. What the king did not personally own was owned absolutely by others. The King's lands represented only a small part of Shetland. Apparently without the knowledge of the Norwegian Riksråd (Council of the Realm) he entered into a commercial contract on 8 September 1468 with the King of Scots in which he pawned his personal interests in Orkney for 50,000 Rhenish guilders. On 28 May the next year he also pawned his Shetland interests for 8,000 Rhenish guilders. There was an obligation to retain the language and laws of Norway, which was not only implicit in the pawning document, but is acknowledged in later correspondence between James III and King Christian's son John (Hans). In 1470 William Sinclair, 1st Earl of Caithness ceded his title to James III and on 20 February 1472, the Northern Isles were directly annexed to the Crown of Scotland.

James and his successors fended off all attempts by the Danes to redeem them (by formal letter or by special embassies were made in 1549, 1550, 1558, 1560, 1585, 1589, 1640, 1660 and other intermediate years) not by contesting the validity of the claim, but by simply avoiding the issue.

Hansa era
From the early 15th century on the Shetlanders sold their goods through the Hanseatic League of German merchantmen. The Hansa would buy shiploads of salted fish, wool and butter and import salt, cloth, beer and other goods. The late 16th century and early 17th century was dominated by the influence of the despotic Robert Stewart, Earl of Orkney, who was granted the islands by his half-sister Mary Queen of Scots, and his son Patrick. The latter commenced the building of Scalloway Castle, but after his execution in 1609 the Crown annexed Orkney and Shetland again until 1643 when Charles I granted them to William Douglas, 7th Earl of Morton. These rights were held on and off by the Mortons until 1766, when they were sold by James Douglas, 14th Earl of Morton to Sir Laurence Dundas.

British era
The trade with the North German towns lasted until the 1707 Act of Union prohibited the German merchants from trading with Shetland. Shetland then went into an economic depression as the Scottish and local traders were not as skilled in trading with salted fish. However, some local merchant-lairds took up where the German merchants had left off, and fitted out their own ships to export fish from Shetland to the Continent. For the independent farmers of Shetland this had negative consequences, as they now had to fish for these merchant-lairds. With the passing of the Crofters' Holdings (Scotland) Act 1886 the Liberal prime minister William Ewart Gladstone emancipated crofters from the rule of the landlords. The Act enabled those who had effectively been landowners' serfs to become owner-occupiers of their own small farms.

During the 200 years after the pawning, the islands were passed back and forth fourteen times between the Crown and courtiers as a means of extracting income. Laws were changed, weights and measures altered and the language suppressed, a process historians now call "feudalisation" as a means by which Shetland became incorporated into Scotland, particularly during the 17th century. The term is a nonsense because a feudal charter requires ownership by the Crown – ownership it has never had and has never openly claimed to have had. As late as the 20th century the courts declared that no land in Shetland was under feudal tenure.

The Crown might have thought that by prescription (the passage of time) it gave them ownership necessary to give out feudal charters, grants, or licences. It certainly behaved that way. Nevertheless, this was proved wrong by the Treaty of Breda (1667). Its direct concern was the redistribution of colonial lands throughout the world after the second Anglo-Dutch war. It was signed by ‘the plenipotentiaries of Europe’ - delegations having full government power.
 	
The Danish delegation tried to have a clause inserted to have the islands returned without delay. Because the overall treaty was too important to Charles II he eventually conceded that the original marriage document still stood, that his and previous monarchs’ actions in granting out the islands under feudal charters were illegal.

In 1669 Charles passed his 1669 Act for annexation of Orkney and Shetland to the Crown, restoring the situation much as it had been in 1469. He abolished the office of Sheriff and "erected Shetland into a Stewartry", having "a direct dependence upon His Majesty and his officers" (what today we would today call a Crown Dependency). Charles II also provided that, in the event of a "general dissolution of his majesty’s properties" by which he clearly meant the Act of Union, Shetland was not to be included. Shetland could not be incorporated into the realm of Scotland or the proposed new union with England. The terms of the marriage document also meant that any Acts of Parliament before or after the pawning could have had no relevance to Shetland.

With the consent of Parliament, Charles was taking the exclusive rights to the islands back to the Crown for all time coming. Furthermore, he was specifically excluding Shetland from the coming Act of Union, even going so far as to say that the Act of Union itself would be null and void if Shetland were to be included.

	
Several attempts were made during the 17th and 18th centuries to redeem the islands, without success. Following a legal dispute with William, Earl of Morton, who held the estates of Orkney and Shetland, Charles II ratified the pawning document by a Scottish Act of Parliament on 27 December 1669 which officially made the islands a Crown dependency and exempt from any "dissolution of His Majesty’s lands". In 1742 a further Act of Parliament returned the estates to a later Earl of Morton, although the original Act of Parliament specifically ruled that any future act regarding the islands status would be "considered null, void and of no effect".

Nonetheless, Shetland's connection with Norway has proven to be enduring. When the union between Norway and Sweden ended in 1906 the Shetland authorities sent a letter to King Haakon VII in which they stated: "Today no 'foreign' flag is more familiar or more welcome in our voes and havens than that of Norway, and Shetlanders continue to look upon Norway as their mother-land, and recall with pride and affection the time when their forefathers were under the rule of the Kings of Norway."

Napoleonic wars
Some 3000 Shetlanders served in the Royal Navy during the Napoleonic wars from 1800 to 1815.

World War II
During World War II a Norwegian naval unit nicknamed the "Shetland Bus" was established by the Special Operations Executive Norwegian Section in the autumn of 1940 with a base first at Lunna and later in Scalloway in order to conduct operations on the coast of Norway. About 30 fishing vessels used by Norwegian refugees were gathered in Shetland. Many of these vessels were rented, and Norwegian fishermen were recruited as volunteers to operate them.

The Shetland Bus sailed in covert operations between Norway and Shetland, carrying men from Company Linge, intelligence agents, refugees, instructors for the resistance, and military supplies. Many people on the run from the Germans, and much important information on German activity in Norway, were brought back to the Allies this way. Some mines were laid and direct action against German ships was also taken. At the start the unit was under a British command, but later Norwegians joined in the command.

The fishing vessels made 80 trips across the sea. German attacks and bad weather caused the loss of 10 boats, 44 crewmen, and 60 refugees. Because of the high losses it was decided to procure faster vessels. The Americans gave the unit the use of three submarine chasers (HNoMS Hessa, HNoMS Hitra and HNoMS Vigra). None of the trips with these vessels incurred loss of life or equipment.

The Shetland Bus made over 200 trips across the sea and the most famous of the men, Leif Andreas Larsen (Shetlands-Larsen) made 52 of them.

Cultural influences
Historical, archaeological, place-name and linguistic evidence indicates Norse cultural dominance of Shetland during the Viking period. A few place names might have Pictish origin, but this is disputed. Several genetic studies have been conducted investigating the genetic makeup of the islands' population today in order to establish its origin. Shetlanders are less than half Scandinavian in origin. They have almost identical proportions of Scandinavian matrilineal and patrilineal ancestry (ca 44%), suggesting that the islands were settled by both men and women, as seems to have been the case in Orkney and the northern and western coastline of Scotland, but areas of the British Isles further away from Scandinavia show signs of being colonised primarily by males who found local wives. After the islands were transferred to Scotland thousands of Scots families emigrated to Shetland in the 16th and 17th centuries. Contacts with Germany and the Netherlands through the fishing trade brought smaller numbers of immigrants from those countries. World War II and the oil industry have also brought about population growth through immigration.

Population development

The population development in Shetland has through history been affected by deaths at sea and epidemics. Smallpox afflicted the islands in the 17th and 18th centuries, but as inoculations pioneered by those such as Johnnie Notions came into widespread use the population was able to grow more quickly. By 1861 the population increased to 40,000. The population increase led to a lack of food, and many young men went away to serve in the British merchant fleet. By 100 years later the islands' population had been more than halved, mainly due to many Shetland men being lost at sea during the two world wars, and the waves of emigration in the 1920s and 1930s. Now more people of Shetland background live in Canada, Australia and New Zealand than in Shetland.

Timeline

References

Notes

Footnotes

Further reading
 Coull, James R. "A comparison of demographic trends in the Faroe and Shetland Islands." Transactions of the Institute of British Geographers (1967): 159–166.
 Miller, James. The North Atlantic Front: Orkney, Shetland, Faroe and Iceland at War (2004)
 Nicolson, James R. (1972) Shetland. Newton Abbott. David & Charles.
 Schei, Liv Kjørsvik (2006) The Shetland Isles. Grantown-on-Spey. Colin Baxter Photography. 
 Withrington, Donald J. Shetland and the outside world, 1469–1969. Oxford Univ Pr, 1983.